NeoAccel is a multinational company that sells computer network security products direct to the end-user and through OEM relationships. The company is best known for its SSL VPN-Plus product and related ICAA & TSSL technology. In Jan 2011 NeoAccel was purchased by VMware.

Company profile
NeoAccel was founded in 2004  by former NetScaler (purchased by Citrix) CEO & Founder, Michel Susai.

NetScaler developed the technology that currently accelerates 75% of the world's internet traffic for companies like Google, Yahoo, and AOL. NetScaler was purchased by Citrix in 2005 for $300 million.

NeoAccel has financial support and venture capital infusions from Hotmail founder Sabeer Bhatia, and inventor Prabhu Goel. In 2006 NeoAccel raised $4,000,000 from Baring Private Equity Partners and NTT Leasing.

The company is headquartered in San Jose, California with a development office in Navi Mumbai, India, a support center in Pune, India, and a sales center in Beijing.

Research

The company holds two main patents for secure communications over IP based networks.

Products

NeoAccel's flagship product is SSL VPN-Plus. The company claims it to be the fastest VPN available due to its use of ICAA and TSSL technologies. The product uses SSL for transport and is often categorized as an SSL VPN, although the company markets it as the 3rd Generation VPN.

 SGX-800
 SGX-1200
 SGX-2400
 SGX-4800 is a virtualized global VPN management system for ISPs/MSPs
 SSL VPN-Plus Evaluation Edition for VMware Player
 SSL VPN-Plus for VMware ESX Server

NAC-Plus is the companies Network Access Control device released in 2007

Awards/Recognition
 Red Herring Asia 2006 Winner 
 Gartner 2007 SSL VPN Magic Quadrant 
 Shaping Info Security 2006

Notes 

Network architecture
Computer security software companies
Internet privacy organizations
Companies based in San Jose, California